Oregon Route 217 is an Oregon state highway which serves the western suburbs of Portland. OR 217 is a controlled-access highway which connects U.S. Route 26 with Interstate 5.

OR 217 consists of the Beaverton-Tigard Highway  144 (see Oregon highways and routes).

Route description

For most of its length, OR 217 is a freeway with two travel lanes in each direction, with a third weave lane for exiting and merging, with the exception of its two termini.

The southern terminus of OR 217 is an interchange with I-5.  From there, OR 217 proceeds north, through suburbs of Tigard and Beaverton.  The northern terminus of OR 217 is an interchange with US 26, at that point a freeway known as the Sunset Highway. 

Commuters heading towards either terminus will find themselves on surface streets if they fail to exit. Indeed, southbound travelers wishing to get onto northbound I-5 have to turn left at a traffic signal; southbound travelers of I-5 wishing to become northbound travelers of OR 217 must turn right at a traffic signal at the end of the off-ramp. Access from I-5 North to OR 217 North used to be routed through a 270-degree ramp.  A major rebuild of the I-5/OR 217 junction in 2001 resulted in the construction of a flyover ramp, relieving some of the severe congestion associated with the old design. This reconstruction also left room for future freeway-to-freeway connections in other directions.

Traffic on OR 217 is frequently heavy, especially during rush hour.  The freeway has several major design issues, one of which is the many closely spaced on and off-ramps (sometimes less than 1/4 mile) that result in conflict between entering and exiting traffic.  The Oregon Department of Transportation (ODOT) has started working on an Auxiliary Lanes Project, but is also investigating a major overhaul of this route.

TriMet's Westside Express Service, a commuter rail line, runs parallel to the highway between Tigard and Beaverton.

History

Before the freeway was completed in the late 1960s to the 1970s, OR 217 ran along surface streets. It originally started at the junction of OR 8 and Hall Blvd. in Beaverton, continuing along Hall Boulevard through Beaverton, Progress, Metzger, and Tigard for  until it reached Durham Road. There, it took a left onto Durham Road, following it for about  until the intersection with Boones Ferry Road. The southern terminus was scaled back to Wilsonville (current I-5 exit 286) with the completion of I-5 to Portland. This older highway, called the Beaverton-Aurora Highway, was kept in the state highway system as the Beaverton-Tualatin Highway No. 141, and was recently given the route designation OR 141. The intersection of OR 217 and US 26 in Beaverton was replaced with an interchange in 1986 after two years of construction.

Future 
ODOT started construction on the Auxiliary Lanes Project in December 2021, which aims to add a southbound auxiliary lane from Exit 2A to Exit 6 and a northbound auxiliary lane from Exit 6 to Exit 4. The Allen Boulevard southbound on-ramp and Denney Road southbound off-ramp will be removed for a new frontage road being constructed in place of it.

Exit list

References

217
Transportation in Portland, Oregon
Transportation in Beaverton, Oregon
Transportation in Clackamas County, Oregon
1970s establishments in Oregon